Hans Ledersteger (1898–1971) was an Austrian art director who worked for many years in the German film industry. While mainly employed in Germany, he occasionally also worked in other countries such as Italy and his native Austria including on some post-war Heimatfilm. He worked on around eighty films as Art Director or production designer during his career. He was married to the actress Irmgard Alberti. Their daughter was the actress Barbara Valentin.

Selected filmography
 Schweik in Civilian Life (1927)
 The Woman of Yesterday and Tomorrow (1928)
 Marriage (1928)
 The Missing Wife (1929)
 Madame Bluebeard  (1931)
 Viennese Waltz (1932)
 A Woman Between Two Worlds (1936)
 The Love of the Maharaja (1936)
 The Charm of La Boheme (1937)
 Darling of the Sailors (1937)
 Hotel Sacher (1939)
 Nothing But Coincidence (1949) 
 Kissing Is No Sin (1950)
 Furioso (1950)
 A Thousand Red Roses Bloom (1952)
 Ave Maria (1953)
 Come Back (1953)
 A Musical War of Love (1953)
 Master of Life and Death (1955)
 Marriages Forbidden (1957)
 Hula-Hopp, Conny (1959)

References

Bibliography
 Fritsche, Maria. Homemade Men In Postwar Austrian Cinema: Nationhood, Genre and Masculinity . Berghahn Books, 2013.

External links

1898 births
1971 deaths
Austrian art directors
Film people from Vienna